The 1951 International Cross Country Championships was held in Caerleon, Wales, at the Caerleon Racecourse on 31 March 1951.  A report on the event was given in the Glasgow Herald.

Complete results, medallists, 
 and the results of British athletes were published.

Medallists

Individual Race Results

Men's (9.25 mi / 14.9 km)

Team Results

Men's

Participation
An unofficial count yields the participation of 71 athletes from 8 countries.

 (9)
 (9)
 (9)
 (9)
 (9)
 (9)
 (8)
 (9)

See also
 1951 in athletics (track and field)

References

International Cross Country Championships
International Cross Country Championships
Cross
International Cross Country Championships
International Cross Country Championships, Caerleon
Athletics races in Newport
Cross country running in the United Kingdom